Senones is a commune in the Vosges department in Grand Est in northeastern France. The journalist and writer Pierre Humbourg (1901–1969), winner of the 1948 Prix Cazes, was born in Senones.

Until 1793, Senones was the capital of the Principality of Salm-Salm.

See also 
 Senones Abbey
 Communes of the Vosges department

References

External links 

 Official site

Communes of Vosges (department)
Salm-Salm